The 2008 Senior Open Championship was a senior major golf championship and the 22nd Senior Open Championship, held on 24–27 July at Royal Troon Golf Club in South Ayrshire, Scotland. It was the first Senior Open Championship played at the course and the seventh Senior Open Championship played as a senior major championship.

Bruce Vaughan won after a playoff over John Cook. It was Vaughan's first senior major championship victory.

Venue 
The event was the first Senior Open Championship played at Royal Troon Golf Club, taking  place at the clubs Old Course, designed by Willie Fernie and George Strath. The club was founded in 1878 and had previously hosted The Open Championship eight times.

Course layout 

Source:

Field
The field consisted of 144 competitors; 130 professionals and 14 amateurs.

18-hole stroke play qualifying rounds were held on Monday, 21 July, on three places in Scotland, Dundonald Links Golf Club, Western Gailes Golf Club and Glasgow Gailes Golf Club, for players who were not already exempt. The leading players from the qualifying competitions joined the exempt players for the championship.

71 players made the 36-hole cut, all of them professionals and no amateurs.

Past champions in the field
Four past Senior Open champions participated. Two of them made the 36-hole cut; 2003, 2005 and 2007 champion Tom Watson (tied 5th) and 2004 champion Pete Oakley (tied 68th). 1989 and 1993 champion Bob Charles and 1988, 1990 and 1997 champion Gary Player did not make the cut.

Past winners and runners-up at The Open Championship in the field 
The field included six former winners of The Open Championship. Three of them made the cut; 1986 and 1993 Open champion Greg Norman (tied 5th), 1975, 1977, 1980, 1982 and 1983 Open champion Tom Watson (tied 5th) and 1998 Open champion Mark O'Meara (tied 34th). 1985 Open champion Sandy Lyle, 1963 Open champion Bob Charles and 1959, 1968 and 1974 Open champion Gary Player did not make the cut.

The field also included ten former runners-up at The Open Championship; John Cook (2nd),  Bernhard Langer (4th), Costantino Rocca (tied 8th), Andy Bean (tied 10th), Tom Kite (tied 16th), Mark McNulty (tied 16th), Wayne Grady (tied 27th), Ben Crenshaw (43rd), Gordon J. Brand (missed cut) and Simon Owen (missed cut).

Final round and playoff summaries

Final round
Sunday, 27 July 2009

John Cook and Bruce Vaughan tied the lead after the fourth round, to meet in a sudden death playoff, to decide the winner.

Playoff
Sunday, 27 July 2009

The sudden-death playoff went on the 18th hole until one of the players had a lower score on the hole than the other. Bruce Vaughan beat John Cook with a birdie at the first extra hole. Vaughan rolled in a 15 feet putt after hitting a 5-iron into the green.

References

External links
Results on European Tour website

Senior major golf championships
Golf tournaments in Scotland
Senior Open Championship
Senior Open Championship
Senior Open Championship